"Cool Night" is a song by Paul Davis released as a single in 1981, from the album of the same name. The single peaked at No. 11 on the U.S. pop chart and reached No. 2 on the adult contemporary chart in January 1982.

Chart performance

Cover versions
A cover version of the song was released in 1996 by Joseph Williams (of Toto), on his solo album I Am Alive.

References

1981 singles
Paul Davis (singer) songs
Music published by MPL Music Publishing
1981 songs
Arista Records singles